Edward Julius Sachs Jr, (May 28, 1927 – May 30, 1964) was a United States Auto Club driver who was known as the "Clown Prince of Auto Racing". He coined the phrase "If you can't win, be spectacular".

Early life
Sachs was born May 28, 1927 in Allentown, Pennsylvania.

Professional racing career
His career included eight USAC Championship Trail wins, 25 top-five finishes in 65 career AAA and USAC starts, including the 1958 USAC Midwest Sprint Car Championship. He was an eight time starter of the Indianapolis 500, 1957–64, winning the pole position in 1960 and 1961, with his best finish being second in 1961. Leading the race with only three laps to go, he saw his right rear tire begin to delaminate and pitted to replace it, handing victory to A. J. Foyt. Sachs never regretted his decision not to gamble on the tire, saying, "I'd sooner finish second than be dead".

Death at Indianapolis

Sachs and sports car driver Dave MacDonald, a 500 rookie, were killed in a fiery crash involving seven cars on the second lap of the 1964 Indianapolis 500. MacDonald was driving a car owned and designed by Mickey Thompson, the #83 "Sears-Allstate Special". Thompson had requested USAC officials to visit his shop in California to inspect the car while it was under construction so that he would not invest money in the car if there was a chance that it would be disqualified at the Speedway. USAC accepted the request and passed the car with its ground effects package. By the time the car reached the Speedway in May, USAC had changed their mind and failed it. Working in the cramped spaces of the garage area, Thompson and crew practically rebuilt the car to meet the new USAC specs. These changes, removal of the fenders, changing to larger tires and increasing the height from two inches to four, made the cars very unstable.  Graham Hill tested the vehicle before Indy but refused to drive it in 1963. Masten Gregory crashed earlier in the month due to aerodynamic lift. After MacDonald had qualified and before the race, World Grand Prix Formula One Champion Jim Clark, who knew MacDonald and respected his ability, followed the Californian for several laps. After they pulled in, Clark emphatically urged MacDonald to get out of the car. "Get out," Clark said, "just get out and walk away." But MacDonald felt obligated to honor his contract with Thompson. Other drivers took Gregory's advice and stayed away from the Thompson cars. Before the race, Gregory approached Formula One driver Jack Brabham, who was alongside MacDonald on the grid, and urged Brabham to allow the rookie a lot of room. Brabham credited Gregory's advice with saving his life.

On the second lap, MacDonald lost control coming off the fourth turn. As the car began to slide, he came across the track and hit the inside wall, igniting the 45-gallon fuel load which erupted into a massive fire. His car then slid back across the track. Sachs, following Bob Veith, aimed for an opening along the outside wall that was soon closed by MacDonald's burning car. Veith made it through by inches, but Sachs hit MacDonald's car broadside causing a second explosion. Johnny Rutherford, following Sachs, having no place to go except into the inferno, decided his only chance was to power his way through. Going at full throttle, his Watson Roadster went under Sachs and over MacDonald taking the injectors off of MacDonald's engine. After clearing the wreckage, he was then broadsided by the NOVI of Bobby Unser. He then motored (on fire) down the main straight, through turns one and two, up the back straight and through turn three, stopping at a fire-truck station in turn four. Ronnie Duman, following Rutherford, went to the left to avoid the crash. It looked as if he was going to make it through when he was rear-ended by the out of control NOVI, which had lost its steering, splitting his fuel tank which also erupted. Duman then spun into the infield wall, where he received serious burns. He was transported to the Methodist Hospital burn unit by helicopter to begin a lengthy recovery. Rutherford and Unser received minor burns and were released from the track hospital. MacDonald, whose lungs were scorched from inhaling the flames and who was burned over 75% of his body, was awake and alert when he was removed from his car. He was taken to the track hospital then transferred to the Methodist Hospital burn unit by ambulance, where he died two hours later. Chuck Stevenson and Norm Hall were also involved but escaped injury. Despite being trapped in his car, Sachs's driver's suit was only scorched, but he received critical burns on his face and hands. The car was covered with a tarp before being taken to the garage area for removal of his body. It has never been determined if he died of asphyxiation, burns or blunt force injury. One driver stated that he saw him struggling to get out of the car after the impact. A lemon that had been on a string around Sachs's neck was found inside Rutherford's engine compartment after the crash.

The crash was well documented on film and shown worldwide. For the first time in its history, the Indianapolis 500 was stopped because of an accident. Partially in response to media pressure, for subsequent races USAC required that cars carry less fuel and make a mandatory minimum of two pit stops. The new pit-stop rule negated any mileage advantage gasoline-powered cars would have had, so gasoline has not been used since. Every race from 1965 forward has been run using methanol or ethanol-based fuels.

Complete AAA/USAC Championship Car results

Indianapolis 500 results

World Championship career summary
The Indianapolis 500 was part of the FIA World Championship from 1950 through 1960. Drivers competing at Indy during those years were credited with World Championship points and participation. Accordingly, Sachs participated in four World Championship races. He started on the pole once, but scored no World Championship points.

Awards
Sachs was inducted into the National Sprint Car Hall of Fame in 1999.

Personal life
Sachs married Nance McGarrity of Coopersburg, Pennsylvania on June 3, 1959 at the home of Harry Hamilton, a relative of his car owner, Peter Schmidt in Indianapolis, Indiana. Their son, Edward Julius Sachs, III was born on February 6, 1962. Nance Sachs died on September 28, 2005 at her home in Clinton Township, Michigan. She is survived by her son Edward III, and grandchildren, Edward IV and Meagan Sachs. Forty-one years after his death, she was buried next to her beloved Eddie in Holy Saviour Cemetery in Bethlehem, Pennsylvania. Using the name "Eddie Sachs, Jr,"  Eddie III became a race car driver racing on the local dirt tracks in the Midwest. Unlike his famous father, he never raced in the Indianapolis 500. He has become a businessman as the owner of Sachs and Associates in Lake Orion, Michigan. He has been a part-time car owner in various levels of motorsport, currently in the USAC Silver Crown Series.

See also
 List of Indianapolis 500 fatal accidents

References

External links

1927 births
1964 deaths
Filmed deaths in motorsport
Indianapolis 500 drivers
Indianapolis 500 polesitters
National Sprint Car Hall of Fame inductees
Racing drivers from Pennsylvania
Racing drivers who died while racing
Sports deaths in Indiana
Sportspeople from Allentown, Pennsylvania
USAC Stock Car drivers